Pavel Starostin (born April 25, 1955) is an Estonian politician. He was a member of X Riigikogu.

See also
Politics of Estonia

References

1955 births
Living people
Estonian Centre Party politicians
Members of the Riigikogu, 2003–2007
Estonian people of Russian descent
Place of birth missing (living people)